The Mirlees Review was a comprehensive review of the UK tax system undertaken in 2010, chaired by the Nobel laureate Sir James Mirrlees for the Institute for Fiscal Studies. The findings were launched in November 2010 and were published by Oxford University Press in two volumes. The report argued that it was possible for governments to raise the same revenues at significantly lower cost than the current system of taxation and submitted recommendations to support this notion.

Panel
The review panel members were:

 Sir James Mirrlees
 Stuart Adam
 Timothy Besley
 Richard Blundell
 Stephen Bond
 Robert Chote
 Malcolm Gammie
 Paul Johnson
 Gareth Myles
 James Poterba

Key Principles
The report was based on the following key principles. A tax system should:
 Be designed as a whole in conjunction with a benefits system
 Seek to be neutral and minimise distortion in the market
 Be progressive as efficiently as possible

Recommendations
The report recommendations included subjects of taxation of earnings, indirect taxes, taxation of housing, environmental taxes, taxes on savings and business taxes.

References

External links
 Mirrlees Review at the Institute for Fiscal Studies.

Tax reform